Kumertau (Kümertaw) is a town in the Republic of Bashkortostan, Russia, located  from Ufa and  from Sterlitamak. Population:

Administrative and municipal status
Within the framework of administrative divisions, it is, together with four rural localities, incorporated as the town of republic significance of Kumertau—an administrative unit with the status equal to that of the districts. As a municipal division, the town of republic significance of Kumertau is incorporated as Kumertau Urban Okrug.

Demographics
Ethnic composition: Russians: 61.6%; Bashkirs: 16.4%; Tatars: 12.9%; Chuvash people: 4%; others: 5.1%.

Economy
Kumertau Aviation Production Enterprise is located in Kumertau, which produces helicopters (part of the holding Russian Helicopters).

References

Notes

Sources

Cities and towns in Bashkortostan
Monotowns in Russia